The first colonies of the British Empire on the continent of Australia were the penal colony of New South Wales, founded in 1788, and the Swan River Colony (later renamed Western Australia), founded in 1829. Over the next few decades, the colonies of New Zealand, Queensland, South Australia, Van Diemen's Land (later renamed Tasmania), and Victoria were created from New South Wales, as well as an aborted Colony of North Australia. On 1 January 1901, these colonies, excepting New Zealand, became states in the Commonwealth of Australia. Since federation, the internal borders have remained mostly stable, except for the creation of some territories with limited self-government: the Northern Territory from South Australia, to govern the vast, sparsely populated centre of the country; the split of the Northern Territory into Central Australia and North Australia, and then the quick merger of those back into the Northern Territory; and the Australian Capital Territory, a federal district ceded from New South Wales.

Outside of the continent, Queensland attempted an expansion into New Guinea, but British authorities rejected this; the claim would later be made a British protectorate and ceded to Australia. The League of Nations mandated northeast New Guinea to Australia after World War I, as well as Nauru, which was placed under joint Australian-British-New Zealand jurisdiction. These mandates (and, later, United Nations trust territories) became the independent nations of Nauru and Papua New Guinea in the mid-20th century. Australia has also obtained several small island territories, mainly from earlier British colonies, and has a large claim on Antarctica.

Table of changes
Key to map colours

Colonial period

Federation

Proposed Boundary change to the Australian Capital Territory
In September 2022, it was announced the border between NSW and the ACT would change for the first time since it was created in 1911. ACT chief minister Andrew Barr said NSW premier Dominic Perrottet had agreed to a proposed border change for 330 hectares of land.

See also
 States and territories of Australia
 List of proposed states of Australia
 Northern Territory borders
 South Australian borders
 Western Australia border

References

External links
 States of Australia – Statoids.com
 The Australian Institute of Aboriginal and Torres Strait Islander Studies provides a map of estimated territorial boundaries of the various First Nations of Australia

States and territories of Australia
Australia
Borders of Australia